Randel Edward Vataha, (born December 4, 1948) is a former American football player, a wide receiver for seven seasons in the National Football League (NFL), the first six with the New England Patriots.

Early years
Born in Santa Monica, California, Vataha lettered in four sports at Rancho Alamitos High School in Garden Grove; he was a quarterback in football and graduated

College career
Vataha made the transition to wide receiver at Golden West Junior College in  then transferred up the coast to Stanford of the Pacific-8 Conference in 1969 under head coach John Ralston and became one of quarterback Jim Plunkett's favorite receiving targets. As seniors in 1970, they connected on a 96-yard touchdown  a Stanford record which stood until 1999 (by a 98-yard pass from Joe Borchard to Troy Walters).

At the end of that season, Vataha scored the last touchdown in Stanford's  upset of #2 Ohio State in the Rose Bowl, a ten-yard pass from Plunkett with eight minutes  both are members of the Stanford Athletic Hall of Fame. Plunkett won the Heisman Trophy and was the first pick of the 1971 NFL Draft; Stanford climbed to eighth in the final AP poll with a  

Vataha was nicknamed "Rabbit" for his moves on the field and worked one summer at Disneyland in costume as one of the

NFL career
Vataha was selected in the 17th round of that NFL draft (418th overall) by the Los Angeles Rams. Released in training camp, he was signed as a free agent by the New England Patriots, where he was reunited with Plunkett. Vataha caught 178 receptions for 3,055 yards. He also had 23 touchdown receptions while with the Patriots. He was waived by the Patriots before the start of the 1977 season and signed with the Green Bay Packers. He ended his career with the Green Bay Packers  

Vataha, along with Stanley Morgan, was one of two wide receivers named to the New England Patriots 1970’s All-Decade Team.

After football
After retiring from football, Vataha was a founding member of the United States Football League (USFL) in 1983, owning 50% of the Boston Breakers. He is now the president of Game Plan LLC, a company that specializes in the buying and selling of professional

References

External links

Sports Reference – college football – Randy Vataha

1948 births
Living people
American football wide receivers
Stanford Cardinal football players
New England Patriots players
Players of American football from Santa Monica, California
Green Bay Packers players
United States Football League executives